Eric Traoré (born 21 May 1996) is a Burkinabé professional footballer who plays as a winger for Egyptian Premier League club Pyramids and the Burkina Faso national team.

Club career 
Traoré signed with Pyramids in December 2018.

International career 
In January 2014, coach Brama Traore, invited him to be a part of the Burkina Faso squad for the 2014 African Nations Championship. The team was eliminated in the group stages after losing to  Uganda and Zimbabwe and then drawing with Morocco.

References

External links 
 

1996 births
Living people
Burkinabé footballers
Association football midfielders
Burkina Faso international footballers
Burkina Faso A' international footballers
2021 Africa Cup of Nations players
2014 African Nations Championship players
US Ouagadougou players
Egyptian Premier League players
Aswan SC players
Misr Lel Makkasa SC players
Burkinabé expatriate footballers
Burkinabé expatriate sportspeople in Egypt
Expatriate footballers in Egypt
21st-century Burkinabé people